For the British diplomat, see Augustus Paget.

Second Lieutenant Augustus Paget  (1898 – 30 October 1918) was a British World War I flying ace credited with six aerial victories.

Biography

Early life
Augustus Paget was one of 13 children born to George Lewis Paget (b. 1849), of Kenilworth Farm, Bromham, Wiltshire, and his wife Harriet Miriam.

Military service

Paget served in the 27th Territorial Reserve Battalion, before transferring to the Royal Flying Corps. On 10 September 1917 he was sent to the 1st Officer Cadet Wing for basic military training. He attended No. 1 School of Military Aeronautics from 13 October, and No. 2 School of Military Aeronautics from 2 November. From cadet he was commissioned as a temporary second lieutenant (on probation) on 1 January 1918.

On 2 February 1918, he was assigned to No. 35 Wing, and posted to No. 1 Training Depot Station. He was transferred to No. 63 Training Depot Station on 20 March, and was confirmed in his rank on 25 May. Paget was posted to No. 2 Flying School on 24 June, and on 10 August was assigned to No. 14 Wing, and on 15 August to No. 66 Squadron in Italy.

He gained his first aerial victory on 15 September when he destroyed a Berg D.I north-east of Feltre. On 25 October he was credited with two Hansa-Brandenburg C.I reconnaissance aircraft driven down out of control west of Feltre, one solo, and one shared with Lieutenant Darrell Joseph Tepoorten. On 27 October he destroyed an observation balloon, and the next day shot down in flames two Albatros D.V fighters over Godega aerodrome. On 30 October his aircraft was shot down over Fontanafredda by anti-aircraft fire, and he was killed.

Legacy
Paget is buried in the Communal Cemetery in Fontanafredda, and is also commemorated, alongside his older brothers Edwin and Colin, on a memorial plaque at Saint Nicholas' Church at Bromham.

Paget's award of the Distinguished Flying Cross was gazetted posthumously on 1 January 1919.

References
Citations

Bibliography
 

1898 births
1918 deaths
Royal Air Force officers
British Army personnel of World War I
People from Wiltshire
Royal Flying Corps officers
Royal Air Force personnel of World War I
British World War I flying aces
British military personnel killed in World War I
Aviators killed by being shot down
Recipients of the Distinguished Flying Cross (United Kingdom)
Burials in Italy
Military personnel from Wiltshire